Saori Miyazaki is a Japanese basketball player. She is part of the Japanese team in the women's tournament at the 2020 Summer Olympics, winning a silver medal.

References

External links 

 “Queen” Saori Miyazaki, the Japan Women’s Basketball National Team July 31, 2021

1995 births
Living people
Japanese women's basketball players
Shooting guards
Basketball players at the 2018 Asian Games
Asian Games bronze medalists for Japan
Asian Games medalists in basketball
Medalists at the 2018 Asian Games
Basketball players at the 2020 Summer Olympics
Olympic basketball players of Japan
Olympic medalists in basketball
Olympic silver medalists for Japan
Medalists at the 2020 Summer Olympics
21st-century Japanese women